The Guadalfeo is a small river in the province of Granada, Spain between the Sierra Nevada mountain range and the coastal ranges of Sierra de la Contraviesa and Lújar.

This river is formed by the merging of three rivers, the Rio Poqueira, Río Trevélez, and Cádiar. The Poqueira and the Trevélez join shortly before the confluence with the Cádiar near the town of Órgiva. The river flows through the region of La Alpujarra for much of its course and enters the sea near Motril after passing through a spectacular gorge between the Lújar and Chaparal mountains. Although it is often dried up by this point, its waters are often used for agricultural purposes. The Rules dam was recently built across the river near Vélez de Benaudalla at the head of the gorge, resulting in the creation of a large reservoir and the flooding of a section of the river valley.

See also 
 List of rivers of Spain

Rivers of Spain
Rivers of Andalusia